Jason Howell Jenkins (born 2 December 1995) is a South African rugby union player for United Rugby Championship and Champions Cup side Leinster. His regular position is lock, though he can also play in the back-row.

Career

2014
After completing high school at St. Alban's College in Pretoria, Jenkins joined the  Academy. He established himself in the  squad that participated in the 2014 Under-21 Provincial Championship, appearing in all fourteen of their matches in the competition and starting thirteen of those. He scored tries in their matches against the s and the s to help the Blue Bulls finish top of the log to qualify for the semi-finals. He helped the Blue Bulls to a 43–20 victory in their semi-final match against the Sharks U19s and he also started the final, where the Blue Bulls lost 26–33 to Western Province.

2015
In 2015, Jenkins was named in the  squad for the 2015 Varsity Cup competition.

Jenkins was named in a 37-man South Africa Under-20 training squad and appeared for them as a replacement in a 31–24 victory in a friendly match against a Varsity Cup Dream Team that was named at the conclusion of the 2015 Varsity Cup competition. He was then named in their squad to tour Argentina for a two-match series as preparation for the 2015 World Rugby Under 20 Championship. He started their 25–22 victory over Argentina in the first match, as well as 39–28 win in the second match four days later.

Upon the team's return, he was named in the final squad for the 2015 World Rugby Under 20 Championship. He played in all three of their matches in Pool B of the competition; he played off the bench in a 33–5 win against hosts Italy, before starting both their 40–8 win against Samoa and their 46–13 win over Australia. Jenkins also scored a try in each of the two matches that he started to help South Africa finish top of Pool B to qualify for the semi-finals with the best record pool stage of all the teams in the competition. He started their semi-final match against England, but could not prevent them losing 20–28 to be eliminated from the competition by England for the second year in succession. He started their third-place play-off match against France, scoring his third try of the competition to help South Africa to a 31–18 win to win the bronze medal.

He then played for the s in the 2015 Under-21 Provincial Championship Group A, but was also named in the senior squad for the 2015 Currie Cup Premier Division.

South Africa 'A' and Springboks

In 2016, Jenkins was included in a South Africa 'A' squad that played a two-match series against a touring England Saxons team. He didn't play in their first match in Bloemfontein, but started the second match of the series, a 26–29 defeat in George.

He made his Test debut for the senior Springboks on 2 June 2018 against Wales in Washington, D.C. at the age of 22 years.

Toyota Verblitz

He joined Japanese Top League side Toyota Verblitz for the 2017–18 season.

Munster

Jenkins joined Irish United Rugby Championship and Champions Cup side Munster on a one-year contract for the 2021–22 season, joining his former Bulls teammate RG Snyman at the club. He made his senior competitive debut for the province in their 2021–22 Champions Cup round 2 fixture at home to French side Castres on 18 December 2021, coming on as a replacement for Jean Kleyn in Munster's 19–13 victory. Jenkins endured a difficult start to his time with Munster, as shoulder, thigh and abdominal injuries restricted him to just one appearance for the province by the start of 2022. Jenkins returned from the run of injured to make his United Rugby Championship debut for the province in their 51–22 home win against Italian side Benetton in round 14 on 25 March 2022, coming on as a 63rd minute replacement for Alex Kendellen.

Leinster

Jenkins joined Leinster from the 2022–23 season. He has played 9 matches in the URC and the Champions Cup in this season.

References

External links

Munster Profile
URC Profile

South African rugby union players
Living people
1995 births
White South African people
Rugby union players from Pretoria
South African people of Welsh descent
Blue Bulls players
Bulls (rugby union) players
Toyota Verblitz players
Munster Rugby players
Leinster Rugby players
South Africa Under-20 international rugby union players
South Africa international rugby union players
South African expatriate rugby union players
South African expatriate sportspeople in Ireland
Expatriate rugby union players in Ireland
Rugby union locks